Katharine, Catherine or Kate Johnson (or similar) may refer to:

People

Arts
Katharine McMahon Johnson (1855–1924), American literary figure and wife of Robert Underwood Johnson
Katie Johnson (English actress) (1878–1957)
Kate Edelman Johnson (born in 1893 ), American film and television producer and philanthropist
Kathie Lee Johnson (born 1953), American singer and television personality
Catherine Johnson (playwright) (born 1957), English playwright
Catherine Johnson (novelist) (born 1962), English author
Katy Johnson (born 1978), American beauty pageant winner, Miss Vermont 1999
Kate Johnson (writer) (born 1982), English author
Kate Lang Johnson (born 1984), American actress and model
Katie Johnson (American actress) (born 1986), American model and actress

Sports
Kathy Johnson (born 1959), American artistic gymnast
Kathryn Johnson (field hockey, born 1963), Canadian field hockey player
Kathryn Johnson (field hockey, born 1967), English field hockey player
Kate Johnson (rower) (born 1978), American rower
Kathryn Johnson (rugby union) (born 1991), American rugby player

Others
Catherine Johnson (scientist), planetary scientist
Kathryn Magnolia Johnson (1878–1954), educator and political activist
Katherine Johnson (1918–2020), American physicist, space scientist, and mathematician
Katie Johnson (secretary) (born 1981), American assistant to President Obama

Characters
Katherine Johnson, a character in Jack Higgins' novel Day of Reckoning

Other uses
S. S. Katherine Johnson, an NG-OA Cygnus cargo space capsule used on ISS mission Cygnus NG-15
USS Catherine Johnson (SP-390), American ship built in 1913; scrapped in 1932

See also
Katie Johnson (disambiguation)
Kathy Johnson (disambiguation)
Katarina Johnson-Thompson (born 1993), English track and field athlete
Katrina Johnson (born 1982), American actress
Katrina McClain Johnson (born 1965), American basketball player 
Louisa Catherine Johnson (1775–1852), American First Lady and wife of John Quincy Adams
Kathrine Johnsen (1917–2002), Norwegian broadcaster considered the mother of Sámi radio
Kathryn Johnston (disambiguation)
 Johnson (disambiguation)